Cap Caxine is a cape located in Algeria.

See also
List of lighthouses in Algeria

References

External links
Cap Caxine Ministere des Travaux Public

Geography of Algeria
Lighthouses in Algeria